Gournay is the name or part of the name of six communes of France:
Gournay, Indre in the Indre département
Gournay-en-Bray in the Seine-Maritime département
Gournay-le-Guérin in the Eure département
Gournay-Loizé in the Deux-Sèvres département
Gournay-sur-Aronde in the Oise département
Gournay-sur-Marne in the Seine-Saint-Denis département

Gournay may also refer to:

Marie de Gournay (1565–1645), 17th-century French writer
Jacques Claude Marie Vincent de Gournay (1712-1759), 18th-century French economist.
Gournay Court a country house in West Harptree, Somerset, England